{{Speciesbox
|genus = Namibiocesa
|species = incana
|authority = (Munro, 1963)
|display_parents = 3
|synonyms = *Leucothrix incana Munro, 1963
}}Namibiocesa incana''' is a species of tephritid or fruit flies in the genus Namibiocesa'' of the family Tephritidae.

Distribution
South Africa.

References

Tephritinae
Insects described in 1963
Diptera of Africa